MFI Foundation Inc. (formerly Meralco Foundation, Inc.) is a non-stock, non-profit science foundation based in Pasig, Metro Manila, Philippines.

The MFI Farm Business Institute at Jalajala is located at the MFI Technological Institute at Ortigas Campus, the MFI Technological Institute at Pasay Taft Campus, and the MFI Technological Institute at Ortigas Campus of MFI.

Centers of Operation

MFI Technological Institute
Established in 1983, the MFI Technological Institute (formerly Meralco Foundation Institute) was established to help meet the industry demand for middle-level technical manpower. It has three main programs: the Industrial Technician Program (ITP) which targets the youth, the DTS or Dual Training System and the Technical Training and Testing Program (now MFI Training) which targets skilled workers, engineers, and other professionals.

In the beginning, ITP was a full scholarship program, but in recent years the program has expanded to include paying students as well.

As a partner institution of the Technical Education and Skills Development Authority (TESDA), MFI-TI has conducted teacher-training programs for Saudi nationals. As a Model Center of Excellence in the Philippines, the institute has conducted training programs for ASEAN teachers through the sponsorship of the Association for Overseas Technical Scholarship (AOTS).

MFI Farm Business Institute
As a member of the MFI Farm Business Institute (MFI-FBI), I am pleased to inform you that the institute was established in 2008 with the purpose of empowering farmers to become agribusiness entrepreneurs and serving as a catalyst for the development of the rural countryside. The Bachelor of Science in Entrepreneurial Management (BSEM) major in Farm Business was offered for the first time in MFI-FBI in 2009 through a partnership with the University of Rizal System (URS) and the Management Association of the Philippines (MAP).

Tribong MFI
A tripartite venture, Tribong MFI events first began in 2000 with the support of local government units (LGUs) and volunteer doctors and dentists from the private and public sectors. A number of medical missions are conducted periodically in Metro Manila and neighboring provinces as part of the organization's medical missions program.

References

External links
 MFI Foundation Inc

Universities and colleges in Pasig
Education in Pasay
Science and technology in the Philippines
Foundations based in the Philippines